Quarry Park is a planned and approved CTrain light rail station in Calgary, Alberta, Canada part of the Green Line.  Construction will begin in 2022 and complete in 2027 as part of construction stage one, segment one. The station is located in the largely commercial community of Quarry Park and will also serve the suburban communities of Douglas Glen and Riverbend.   

The station will connect one of the largest employment centres along the line, and is host to a number of large corporations and head offices for companies such as Imperial Oil. It will have waiting and station facilities and improved pedestrian and cycling connections. There is also a proposed pedestrian crossing from the station across 24 Street SE leading to the new recreation centre and library.

References 

CTrain stations
Railway stations scheduled to open in 2027